Sree Narayana College, Cherthala, is a general degree college located in Cherthala, Alappuzha district, Kerala. It was established in the year 1964. The college is affiliated with Kerala University. This college offers different courses in arts, commerce and science.

Departments

Science

Physics
Chemistry
Computer Science
Botany
Zoology
Geology
Mathematics

Arts and Commerce

Malayalam
English
Sanskrit
Hindi
History
Political Science
economics
Philosophy
Physical Education
Commerce

Accreditation
The college is  recognized by the University Grants Commission (UGC).
Naac A grade

Notable alumni
Ratheesh, Malayalam film actor
Rajan P Dev, malayalam film actor
A. M. Ariff, Ex-MLA, current MP

References

External links
http://www.sncollegecherthala.in

Universities and colleges in Alappuzha district
Educational institutions established in 1964
1964 establishments in Kerala
Arts and Science colleges in Kerala
Colleges affiliated to the University of Kerala